Dunfee is an unincorporated community in Whitley and Allen counties, in the U.S. state of Indiana.

History
A post office was established at Dunfee in 1883, and remained in operation until 1917. The community was likely named after the Dunfee family of settlers.

Geography

References

Unincorporated communities in Whitley County, Indiana
Unincorporated communities in Allen County, Indiana
Unincorporated communities in Indiana